George Arthur Durlam (1895–1952) was an American screenwriter and film producer. He also directed several short documentary films as well as the 1931 western Two Fisted Justice. Much of his work took place on Poverty Row.

Selected filmography
 Ace of Clubs (1925)
 Red Blood (1925)
 Riding Romance (1925)
 Code of Honor (1930)
 Beyond the Law (1930)
 The Canyon of Missing Men (1930)
 Call of the Desert (1930)
 Under Texas Skies (1930)
 In Line of Duty (1931)
 Oklahoma Jim (1931)
 The Riding Kid (1931)
 Near the Trail's End (1931)
 Riders of the North (1931)
 Partners of the Trail (1931)
 The Montana Kid (1931)
 Two Fisted Justice (1931)
 The Man from Death Valley (1931)
 South of Santa Fe (1932)
 Ghost City (1932)
 Paradise Valley (1934)
 Captured in Chinatown (1935)
 Custer's Last Stand (1936)
 Aces and Eights (1936)
 Lightnin' Bill Carson (1936)
The Great Adventures of Wild Bill Hickok (1938)
 Frontier Crusader (1940)
 Swamp Woman (1941)
 Boot Hill Bandits (1942)

References

Bibliography
 Pitts, Michael R. Poverty Row Studios, 1929–1940: An Illustrated History of 55 Independent Film Companies, with a Filmography for Each. McFarland & Company, 2005.

External links

1895 births
1952 deaths
American screenwriters
American film producers
People from New York City